Blindheim is a surname. Notable people with the surname include:

Charlotte Blindheim (1917–2005), Norwegian archaeologist
Oddbjørn Blindheim (born 1944), Norwegian jazz pianist and dentist
Svein Blindheim (1916–2013), Norwegian military officer
Svein Olav Blindheim (born 1954), Norwegian jazz double bassist, composer and writer